South Bank 1 & 2 ferry wharf is located on the southern side of the Brisbane River serving the Brisbane suburb of South Brisbane in Queensland, Australia. The wharf consists of two jetties, numbered 1 and 2 are used by RiverCity Ferries' CityCat services.

The wharves sustained moderate damage during the January 2011 Brisbane floods. Both reopened after repairs on 14 February 2011.

Location
The wharves are located in the South Bank Parklands near the Queensland Cultural Centre. They provide the closest transport access point to the Streets Beach and the Wheel of Brisbane. It is also close to the Queensland Performing Arts Centre and the Griffith University conservatorium. The western end of the Victoria Bridge is close to the wharves. South Bank wharf 3 is located 500 metres downstream.

Description
Wharves 1 and 2 comprise two separate piers joined at one end in a 'U' shape with the open arms ending in pontoons, each with one docking station. Pontoon 1 lies upstream of pontoon 2 and CityCats coming downstream berth up at pontoon 1 while those coming upstream berth at pontoon 2. There is no separate passenger waiting area for these wharves. However, tree shaded benches are present along the promenade that runs by the head of the piers.

References

External links

Ferry wharves in Brisbane
South Brisbane, Queensland